Peel South (also known as Mississauga riding) was a federal electoral district represented in the House of Commons of Canada from 1968 to 1974. It was located in the province of Ontario. The riding was created in 1966 from parts of the Peel riding.

It consisted of the Township of Toronto in the County of Peel, and the part of Metropolitan Toronto lying west of the Etobicoke River.

The electoral district's name was changed in late 1973 to Mississauga, on a request by then MP Don Blenkarn, to coincide with the creation of the City of Mississauga. It was abolished in 1976 when it was redistributed between Brampton—Halton Hills, Mississauga North and Mississauga South ridings.

Members of Parliament

Election results

|- 
  
|Liberal
|Hyliard Chappell
|align="right"|24,255   
  
|Progressive Conservative
|Earl K. Brownridge
|align="right"|19,065    
 
|New Democratic
|Keith Wollard
|align="right"| 8,498   
|}

|- 
  
|Progressive Conservative
|Don Blenkarn
|align="right"| 31,981    
  
|Liberal
|Bill Kent 
|align="right"| 30,305   
 
|New Democratic
|David Busby
|align="right"| 18,553   
 
|Independent
|Michael Houlton
|align="right"|461   
|}

|- 
  
|Liberal
|Anthony Abbott
|align="right"| 38,517   
  
|Progressive Conservative
|Don Blenkarn 
|align="right"| 34,080    
 
|New Democratic
|David Busby
|align="right"| 14,276   
 
|Independent
|Richard C. Darwin
|align="right"| 227   

|}

See also 
 List of Canadian federal electoral districts
 Past Canadian electoral districts

References

External links 
 Website of the Parliament of Canada

 

Former federal electoral districts of Ontario
Politics of Mississauga